Joaquín Cordero (August 16, 1922 – February 19, 2013) was a Mexican actor of the cinema, theatre and telenovelas.

Biography
Shortly after his birth, Cordero's family moved to Mexico City. In the following years he studied in a seminary and even considered becoming a priest, but eventually he decided to pursue a law career. After three years of law classes he decided to become an actor against his family's wishes. 

He initially appeared in small roles but by his early fifties he was getting much larger roles. Eventually he became one of the most popular actors in Mexican cinema.

Cordero also shown appeared in theatre and on television and in the latter medium in numerous telenovelas and winning numerous awards. His most recent telenovelas included La Madrastra and Destilando Amor.

Death  
According to his family, the actor died of heartbreak, facing a deep depression over the death of his beloved wife, Alma Guzmán, which occurred on July 18, 2012.

Family 
Joaquín was son of Don Rafael Cordero Pita and Rosario Aurrecoechea and brother of Víctor Cordero Aurrecoechea.

Joaquín's wife was Alma Guzmán, half-sister of journalist Maxine Woodside. Alma bore a son named David.

Filmography 

El Corsario Negro (1944) as Pirata (uncredited)
Una Gitana en México (1945)
No Te Cases con mi Mujer (1947)
Mujer (1947) as Ricardo González (uncredited)
Fly Away, Young Man! (1947) as Soldado mensajero (uncredited)
A Vênus de Fogo (1948)
Se la llevó el Remington (1948) as Rodrigo
En los altos de Jalisco (1948) as Hermano de Valentina (uncredited)
La santa del barrio (1948)
La rebelian de los fantasmas (1949) as Romeo
El gran campeón (1949) as Jorge
Yo maté a Juan Charrasasquedo (1949)
No me quieras tanto (1949) as Reynaldo (Chamaco)
Quinto patio (1950) as El rorro
Azahares para tu boda (1950) as Eduardo - adulto
Yo tambien soy de Jalisco (1950)
The Two Orphans (1950) as Morete
Arrabalera (1951) as Luis
Monte de piedad (1951) as El nene
Peregrina (1951) as Marcos Obregón
Tercio de quites (1951) as Luis Ponce
Todos son mis hijos (1951) as Juan Salgado
Con todo el corazón (1952) as Felipe
Mamá nos quita los novios (1952) as Casimiro
Una Mujer sin amor (1952) as Carlos
Las tres alegres Comadres (1952) as Alberto
Prefiero a tu papá..! (1952) as Héctor del Puente
Una calle entre tú y yo (1952) as Padre Carlos
Acuérdate de vivir (1953) as Jorge
Yo soy gallo dondequiera!.. (1953) as Jimmy; Joaquín
Pepe el Toro (1953) as Lalo Gallardo
El gran mentiroso (1953) as Fernanado Palmerin
Venganza en el Circo (1954) as Fernando
El gran autor (1954) as Fernando Medina
Romance de Fieras (1954) as Javier Ponce
Sandunga para tres (1954) as Antonio Ugalde
Prisionera del pasado (1954)
Los aventureros (1954) as Margarito
El Río y la muerte (1954) as Gerardo Anguiano
¡Vaya tipos! (1955)
La gaviota (1955) as Antonio
Tres bribones (1955) as Margarito Santos
¡Que bravas son las costeñas!... (1955) as Pedro
Valentes e Indomáveis (1955) as Miguelón Villalobos
Fuerza de los humildes (1955)
La Venganza de los Villalobos (1955) as Miguelón Villalobos
Fugitivos: Pueblo de Proscritos (1955) as Carlos / Licenciado
Tres Valientes Camaradas (1956)
La Faraona (1956) as Alberto Prim
Tierra de hombres (1956) as Fernando
Cinco vidas y un destino (1957) as Marrcos Navarro
La dulce enemiga (1957) as Nicolás
Al compás del rock and roll (1957)
La mujer marcada (1957) as Germán Álvarez
The Boxer (1958) as Natalio Sanchez / Kid Relampago
Música de siempre  (1958)
It Happened in Mexico (1958) as Aurelio
El derecho a la vida (1959) as Enrique
Las aventuras de Carlos Lacroix (1959)
Kermesse (1959) as Alberto Torres
Flor de canela (1959)
Manicomio (1959) as Dr. Ricardo Andrade
La reina del cielo (1959) as Bartolome
Un chico valiente (1960)
El Tesoro de Chucho el Roto (1960) as Antonio Rioja
¡Qué bonito amor! (1960) as Miguel Rivadeneira
Orlak, el infierno de Frankenstein (1960) as Jaime Rojas / Orlak
Mi amor frente al pasado (1960, TV Series)
El Gato (1961) as El Gato
En carne propia (1961) as Gabriel Lozano
Suerte te dé Dios (1961) as Lupe
Ay Chabela...! (1961)
¡Que padre tan padre! (1961) as Julián Barroso
Santo contra cerebro del mal (1961) as Dr. Campos
Tres tristes tigres (1961) as Lorenzo
Bonitas las tapatías (1961)
Santo contra hombres infernales (1961)
Juventud sin Dios (1962) as Lambert J. Dehner
Asesinos de la lucha libre (1962) as Joaquin
Los cinco halcones (1962) as Trini
Las recién casadas (1962) as Fernando
La moneda rota (1962)
Monte Escondido o Leonardo Moncada (1962) as Leonardo Moncada
El rey de la pistola (1962) as Juan Rosales
El asesino enmascarado (1962)
Atrás de las nubes (1962) as Bandido
Los forajidos (1962)
La herencia (1962, TV Series)
El terrible gigante de las nieves (1963) as Jorge Méndez
La risa de la ciudad (1963) as Beto
En la vieja California (1963) as Antonio / Don Pedro
México de mis recuerdos (1963) as Pablo Flores
Herencia maldita (1963) as Leonardo Moncada
Los bravos de California (1963)
Unpar de sinvergüenzas (1963)El río de las ánimas (1964) as Leonardo MoncadaLa sombra de los hijos (1964) as LauroLos Amores de Marieta - Los Fabulosos 20s (1964)Museo del horror (1964) as LuisAsí amaron nuestros padres (1964)
'''Campeón del barrio' (Su última canción) (1964) as Arturo
El río de las ánimas (1964) as Leonardo Moncada
Historia de un cobarde (1964, TV Series)
Desencuentro (1964, TV Series)
El Pecador (1965) as César Domínguez
Cien gritos de terror (1965) as Julio (segment "Panico")
Los tres calaveras (1965) as Miguel Bermejo
La loba (1965) as Dr. Alejandro Bernstein
El rescate (1965)
Las tapatías nunca pierden (1965) as Manuel
Esta noche no (1966) as Carlos Martínez
El hijo del diablo (1966) as Víctor Rincón
Sangre en el Bravo (1966) as Rafael
Matar es fácil (1966) as Jorge Campos
Estrategia matrimonio (1966) as Germán Andrade
Dr. Satan (1966) as Dr. Satan
Pánico (1966) (segment "Soledad")
Mi caballo prieto rebelde (1967) as Valentín Romero
Los tres mosqueteros de Dios (1967) as Padre Ignacio
Un novio para dos hermanas (1967) as Rodolfo Cáceres / 'Mil Usos'
Los hombres de Lupe Alvírez (1967)
Seis días para morir (1967) as Carlos Garibay
Cómo pescar marido (1967) as Pablo
El centauro Pancho Villa (1967) as Santos Patricio
La Duda (1967, TV Series)
Dr. Satán y la magia negra (1968) as Dr. Satan
Requiem por un canalla (1968) as Jorge
Las luchadoras vs el robot asesino (1969) as Arturo
No juzgarás a tus padres (1969)
El deseo llega de noche (1969) as Dr. Mario Lara
El Libro De Piedra (1969) as Eugenio Ruvalcaba
Una noche bajo la tormenta (1969)
24 horas de placer (1969) as Ruben
La marcha de Zacatecas (1969) as Aparición especial (uncredited)
Patsy, mi amor (1969) as Patsy's father
Trampas de amor (1969) as Mauricio (segment "El dilema")
Lío de faldas (1969) as Daniel
La muñeca perversa (1969) as Ricardo Montenegro
Los problemas de mamá (1970) as Lorenzo
Una señora estupenda (1970) as Fernando
El manantial del amor (1970) as Dr. Armando Suárez
Dos esposas en mi cama (1970)
Los años vacios (1970)
Los corrompidos (1971) as Raúl
Bajo el ardiente sol (1971)
Papa en onda (1971) as Ricardo del Valle
Una vez en la noche (1971)
Las máscaras (1971, TV Series)
El amor tiene cara de mujer (1971, TV Series)
Me llaman Martina Sola (1972, TV Series)
Eva y Dario (1973) as Papá de Dario
¿Quien? (1973, TV Series)
La justicia tiene doce años (1973) as Vicente
Ha llegado una intrusa (1974, TV Series) as Carlos Moran
Fantoche (1977) as Augusto
Cuchillo (1978) as Demonio Azul
El Ardiente Secreto (1978) as Eduardo
Te quiero (1979)
J. J. Juez (1979, TV Series)
Fieras contra fieras (1982)
La voz de la tierra (1982, TV Series)
La niña de los hoyitos (1984) as Alberto
Perros salvajes (1984) as Marcos 'El Gitano'
Eclipse (1984, TV Series) as Emmanuel
Braceras y mojados (1984)
El Cafre (1986) as Pedro Rojas
Ratas de la ciudad (1986)
Conexión criminal (1987)
Como duele callar (1987, TV Series) as Rosendo Cisneros
Amor en silencio (1987, TV Series) as Miguel
Secta satanica (1990)
Un rostro en mi pasado (1990, TV Series) as Armando Estrada
A gozar, a gozar, que el mundo se va acabar (1990)
Triste juventud (1990)
Commando judicial (1990)
Amor de nadie (1990-1991, TV Series) as Raúl
Vacaciones de terror 2 (1991) as Roberto Mondragón
Jóvenes perversos (1991) as Licenciado
Baila conmigo  (1993, TV Series) as German De La Reguera
Los Parientes Pobres (1993, TV Series) as Evaristo Olmos
La Pura (1994) as Bernardo
Canción de amor (1996, TV Series) as Aníbal
Reclusorio (1997) as Juez (segment 'La prostituta violada")
El Sexenio de la muerte (1997) as Dr. Julian Bonaparte
Por tu amor (1999, TV Series) as Lazaro Robledo
Para matar al presidente (1999)
Mi Destino Eres Tú (2000) as José Ignacio Rivadeneira Orendain
Abrázame muy fuerte (2000) as Don Severiano Álvarez
Carita de ángel (2000–2001) as  Don Adolfo Valle 
Padres culpables (2001) as Ramon
Entre el amor y el odio (2002) as Fernando Villareal
¡Vivan los niños! (2002–2003) as Don Joaquín Castillo 
Doble secuestro (2003) as Fernando Cortéz
La Madrastra (2005) as Father Belisario
Destilando Amor (2007) as Don Amador Montalvo 
Amor sin maquillaje (2007) as Himself 
Fuego en la sangre (2008) as Don Agustín Acevedo
Los Inadaptados (2011) as Don Luis (final film role)

References

External links

Male actors from Puebla
Mexican male film actors
Mexican male stage actors
Mexican male telenovela actors
20th-century Mexican male actors
21st-century Mexican male actors
1922 births
2013 deaths